José María García-Aranda Encinar (born 3 March 1956 in Madrid) is a retired football (soccer) referee from Spain, best known for supervising three matches during the 1998 FIFA World Cup in France. He also led two matches at the 2000 UEFA European Football Championship held in Belgium and the Netherlands.

He lives in Switzerland, where he works for the FIFA, the International Football Association, as the Head of Refereeing.

References

 Profile

1956 births
Living people
Spanish football referees
UEFA Champions League referees
Sportspeople from Madrid
FIFA World Cup referees
1998 FIFA World Cup referees
UEFA Euro 2000 referees
Major League Soccer referees